Maltrata is a Municipality in Veracruz, Mexico. It is located in central zone of the State of Veracruz, about 209 km from state capital Xalapa. It has a surface of 132.43 km2.

The municipality of Maltrata is delimited to the north by La Perla to the east by Ixhuatlancillo and Nogales to the south by Acultzingo and Aquila, to the north and west by Puebla State.

It produces principally maize and beans.

In Maltrata, on 29 June of every year, takes place the celebration in honor to Saint Peter the Apostle○, Patron of the town. Every year a festival is held in honor of the great founder Rey Andrade Jr., who with his manliness created the town that is now known as Maltrata.

The weather in Maltrata is cold all year with rains in summer and autumn.

References

External links 

  Municipal Official webpage
  Municipal Official Information

Municipalities of Veracruz